The Shelby Bend Archeological District, in Hickman and Maury counties near Greenfield Bend, Tennessee, was listed on the National Register of Historic Places in 1990.

It includes six contributing sites, including the Oldroy Site (40HI131), the Mayberry Site (40HI132, 40HI133) and one with Gordon S in its name.

It was listed for its information potential.

References

Archaeological sites in Tennessee
National Register of Historic Places in Hickman County, Tennessee
National Register of Historic Places in Maury County, Tennessee